The Jim Coleman Show is a Canadian sports news television series which aired on CBC Television from 1959 to 1960. It was hosted by sports journalist Jim Coleman.

Premise
Jim Coleman was a Toronto sports journalist who hosted this series of sports journalism, featuring interviews with prominent sportspeople with sports news items. The programme appeared after a boxing broadcast.

Scheduling
This 15-minute series was broadcast Fridays at 10:45 p.m. from 4 September 1959 to 24 June 1960.

References

External links
 

CBC Television original programming
1959 Canadian television series debuts
1960 Canadian television series endings
1950s Canadian television news shows
1960s Canadian television news shows
1950s Canadian sports television series
1960s Canadian sports television series
Black-and-white Canadian television shows